William Ross Fiscus (April 2, 1870 – November 6, 1950) was an early professional American football player and coach. He was one of the first pro players on record.

Playing career
Fiscus played for the Allegheny Athletic Association professional football team as a lineman in 1891 and 1892, but by 1893 he had successfully earned the role as halfback. Fiscus continued to play several more years for Allegheny, even dropping out of college to do so. This would have put him alongside the first recorded professional football player Pudge Heffelfinger, who also played for Allegheny. In 1896, he played alongside his brother, Lawson, for the Greensburg Athletic Association.

Coaching career
Fiscus was the second head football coach at Geneva College in Beaver Falls, Pennsylvania, and he held that position for three seasons, from 1897 until 1899. His coaching record at Geneva was 6–9–2.

Later life
Fiscus died November 6, 1950, at his home in the Mount Washington neighborhood of Pittsburgh, Pennsylvania.

Head coaching record

References

1870 births
1950 deaths
19th-century players of American football
American football guards
American football halfbacks
American football tackles
Allegheny Athletic Association players
Geneva Golden Tornadoes football coaches
Greensburg Athletic Association players
Indiana University of Pennsylvania alumni
Washington & Jefferson Presidents football players
People from Indiana County, Pennsylvania
Coaches of American football from Pennsylvania
Players of American football from Pennsylvania